O-saw-wah-pon (1798-1859) was a leader of the Saginaw Band of the Ojibwe.  He was a friend of Lewis Cass and in general sided with the Americans and opposed Tecumseh's plans for war.  He was born in what is today the eastern part of Saginaw, Michigan and died in Isabella County, Michigan.

Sources
History of Saginaw County, Michigan. Chicago: Charles C. Chapman & Co, 1881. p. 184-185.

Ojibwe people
People from Saginaw, Michigan
1798 births
1859 deaths
Native American people from Michigan